Rogalski (feminine: Rogalska; plural: Rogalscy) is a Polish locational surname, which means a person from Rogal in Poland. The name may refer to:

 Bogusław Rogalski (born 1972), Polish politician
 Edward Rogalski (born 1942), American university administrator
 Franz Rogalski (1913–1977), German soldier
 Jerzy Rogalski (born 1948), Polish actor
 Joe Rogalski (1912–1951), American baseball player
 Maciej Rogalski (born 1980), Polish football player
 Maksymilian Rogalski (born 1983), Polish football player
 Michał Rogalski (born 1987), Polish badminton player
 Stanisław Rogalski (1904–1976), Polish aircraft designer
 Theodor Rogalski (1901–1954), Romanian musician

See also
 
 
Rogal (disambiguation)
Rogala, Polish surname
Rogale (disambiguation)

References

Polish-language surnames